Henry Adolph Frost (26 June 1844 – 21 July 1909) was a German-born saddler and businessman known for his association with the company which eventually produced the Holden automobile. His name may have been originally Heinrich Friedrich Adolphe Frost, but he evidently preferred "Adolph Frost".

History
Adolph was born in Hamburg, Germany the only son of Johann Joachim Domenicus (John) Frost (31 March 1813 – 14 December 1865) and his wife Catharina Maria Louisa Juncken (March 1821 – 11 February 1905) and two sisters, who emigrated to South Australia on the barque Steinwaerder (Steinwärder) on the 30 August 1848 from Hamburg, arriving on 12 January 1849 at Port Adelaide, South Australia.

They settled at Lyndoch, and on completion of his schooling learned the skills of the saddler, after which he followed his trade at Rhynie, then around 1869 to Port Wakefield then Yorketown, where he ran a lucrative business, and for a time served as mayor.

Around 1879 he moved to Adelaide to take a position with J. A. Holden, who on 1 May 1884 took him on as partner in J. A. Holden & Co., which was in a precarious position financially. In August 1885 J. A. Holden sold to his son H. J. Holden and H. A. Frost his interest in the retail arm of the company, which in November 1885 became Holden & Frost. He sold the wholesale business and his Kensington Park mansion with its extensive grounds. Under the terms of the voluntary liquidation the company continued to operate in the premises at 100 Grenfell Street.

Under the new management the company progressed from the world of saddles and harness to motor vehicle bodies and upholstery.

Family
Johann Joachim Domenicus (John) Frost (31 March 1813 – 14 Dec 1865) and his wife Catharina Maria Louisa Juncken (March 1821 – 11 February 1905) arrived in SA from Hamburg in 1849. They had one son and three daughters:
Henry Adolph Frost (26 June 1844 – 21 July 1909) married (1) Elizabeth James (9 August 1849 – 10 April 1892) on 8 July 1866 in Penwortham, South Australia.  They had four daughters and three sons. (2) Celia Gray (13 August 1861 – 22 April 1912) on 24 May 1893 in The Bible Christian Church, Franklin Street, Adelaide South Australia. They had three sons.
Amie Frost (26 May 1867 – 14 March 1943) married Edward Welbourn (c. 1864 – 24 March 1942) on 18 April 1888, lived in Western Australia
Fannie? Fanney? Frost (10 May 1869 in Port Wakefield – ) married Walter Ernest Aitken (30 August 1864 – 24 March 1942) on 28 March 1889, lived in Hyde Park
Clara Frost (19 Apr 1871 – 13 Mar 1872) born and died in Port Wakefield
Gertrude Frost (13 December 1873 – ) married (Reuben) Clifton Underwood (9 January 1875 – 28 September 1939) on 8 August 1898, lived at Norwood.
Herbert Adolph Frost (13 February 1878 – 8 September 1910) killed accidentally in Fremantle.
Harold Clare Frost (6 November 1881 at Yorketown – 23 April 1906)
Gilbert James Frost (10 February 1884 – 7 May 1953) married Maria Bennett "Polly" Jacobs (4 July 1879 – ) on 25 September 1907
Raymond Gray (Grey?) Frost (20 May 1894 – 7 April 1966) married (1) Agnes Thelma Millar (13 April 1894 – 4 September 1950) on 30 August 1916 (2) Lynda Dorothy Atkinson (13 September 1897 – 24 December 1959) on 20 July 1922.
Stuart Clifton Frost (22 April 1896 – 11 May 1966) married Ada Elizabeth Pargiter on 16 June 1917 at Camden, Middlesex, England
Louis Henry Frost (13 May 1900 – 19 December 1969) married Rosalie Emily Yeates (12 February 1902 – 19 August 1996) buried at Wallaroo, South Australia.
Louisa Henrietta Caroline Maria Frost (c. 1845 – 25 January 1876) married Robert Swann ( – ) on 1 February 1866
Caroline Sophia Wilhelmina Frost (c. 1848 – 10 January 1927) married George Wise (1840 – 18 May 1904) on 23 May 1872, lived at Gawler then Norwood

References 

German emigrants to Australia
Coachbuilders of Australia
Holden
1844 births
1909 deaths
19th-century Australian businesspeople